The MTV Video Music Award for Artist of the Year is one of the biggest awards given at the annual MTV Video Music Awards. It was first introduced at the 2017 MTV Video Music Awards, replacing both the MTV Video Music Award for Best Male Video and Best Female Video as MTV want to eliminate gender-specific awards.

Ed Sheeran was the first recipient of the award in 2017. Ariana Grande has the most nominations in the category with four, winning the award in 2019. Jonas Brothers is the only group nominated for this award in 2019.

Recipients

Artists with multiple nominations
 4 nominations
Ariana Grande

 2 nominations
Bruno Mars
Cardi B
Drake
Ed Sheeran
Justin Bieber
Megan Thee Stallion
Post Malone
The Weeknd

References

MTV Video Music Awards